Geastrum australe is an inedible species of mushroom belonging to the genus Geastrum, or earthstar fungi. It can be mistaken for Geastrum saccatum or Geastrum simulans, and is found in Melbourne.

References

australe
Inedible fungi
Fungi of Australia
Fungi native to Australia
Fungi described in 1859